The 2020–21  PGA Tour was the 106th season of the PGA Tour, and the 54th since separating from the PGA of America. The season began on September 10, 2020. The 2021 FedEx Cup Playoffs began on August 19, and concluded on September 5, 2021.

Because of rescheduling during the 2019–20 season due to the COVID-19 pandemic, six major championships occurred during the timeframe of the 2020–21 season, with two editions of both the U.S. Open and Masters Tournament, as well as the 2020 Summer Olympics. As such, the PGA Tour marketed this season as a "super season".

By winning the Tour Championship, Patrick Cantlay became the FedEx Cup champion. The Tour Championship was his fourth tournament victory of the season, following earlier successes in the Zozo Championship, the Memorial Tournament and the BMW Championship.

Changes for 2020–21

Membership changes
As a result of changes made due to COVID-19 pandemic, there were several changes to membership criteria for the 2020–21 season:
The 2020–21 season and the preceding 2019–20 season were regarded as one season for exemption purposes. This meant that all players exempt for 2019–20 retained the same exemption status for 2020–21, and existing exemptions for tournament and FedEx Cup winners were extended by one season.
With the 2020 Korn Ferry Tour season having been extended through 2021, there were no graduates to the PGA Tour for 2020–21. However the leading 10 players in the Korn Ferry Tour points standings through the 2020 Korn Ferry Tour Championship were granted exemption to play in the Puerto Rico Open, the Corales Puntacana Resort and Club Championship, the Barbasol Championship and the Barracuda Championship during 2021.

Tournament changes

Field changes
Following the cancellation of ten tournaments due to the COVID-19 pandemic, the PGA Tour announced that for 2021 the field of the Sentry Tournament of Champions would be expanded to include the 30 players qualifying for the 2020 Tour Championship in addition to tournament winners during the 2020 calendar year.
The Puerto Rico Open, the Corales Puntacana Resort and Club Championship in March 2021, the Barbasol Championship and the Barracuda Championship had their fields increased to 132 players.
Due to concerns with the ongoing pandemic the Pro-Am sections of The American Express and AT&T Pebble Beach Pro-Am were canceled, with the tournaments being held as regular events over two courses instead of the usual three.

Status and FedEx Cup points changes
The 2020 editions of the Corales Puntacana Resort and Club Championship and the Bermuda Championship were elevated to full FedEx Cup point events, with winners earning a 2021 Masters Tournament invitation. The Corales Puntacana Resort and Club Championship, held twice during the season, reverted to alternate event status in March 2021, when it will be held opposite the WGC-Dell Technologies Match Play.
The Genesis Invitational, Arnold Palmer Invitational and the Memorial Tournament offered 550 Fedex Cup points, increased from 500 points, the same as the World Golf Championships.
The first two playoff events, The Northern Trust and the BMW Championship, reverted to four times the points of regular events, having been reduced to three times in the 2019–20 season after several tournaments were canceled.

Scheduling change
The Valspar Championship, which since 2007 had been held in March as part of a run of tournaments in Florida, was moved to late April, finishing on May 2.

No longer on the schedule
The 2020 edition of A Military Tribute at The Greenbrier was canceled; the PGA Tour and the Greenbrier Resort also agreed to cancel the remainder of their contract, which had been set to end in 2026.
The 2020 edition of the WGC-HSBC Champions was canceled due to the COVID-19 pandemic.
On March 9, 2021, it was announced that the RBC Canadian Open had been canceled due to the pandemic; it had also been canceled in 2020.

Relocated tournaments
Three of the major championships, the first two FedEx Cup playoff events and the RBC Canadian Open are routinely played at a different host course each year. For several other tournaments with regular host courses, there was also a change in venue for the 2020–21 season, some of them temporary.
The Houston Open moved to Memorial Park Golf Course having been held at the Golf Club of Houston since 2003, and the AT&T Byron Nelson moved to TPC Craig Ranch having been held at Trinity Forest Golf Club since 2018.
The Wells Fargo Championship, intended to be moved to a temporary host venue at TPC Potomac at Avenel Farm, remained at its regular home of Quail Hollow Club in 2021; this was due to the President's Cup that was to be played at Quail Hollow being postponed until 2022.
The CJ Cup was relocated from Nine Bridges Golf Club on Jeju Island, South Korea to Shadow Creek Golf Course in Las Vegas, Nevada; the move was expected to be for one season only, owing to the COVID-19 travel restrictions.
The Zozo Championship was played at Sherwood Country Club instead of Japan; the move, due to travel restrictions caused by the COVID-19 pandemic, was expected to be for one season only.

Additional tournaments
On March 30, 2021, the tour announced that Congaree Golf Club in Ridgeland, South Carolina would host a new tournament, taking the place of the canceled RBC Canadian Open on the schedule. On April 2, the tournament name was confirmed as the Palmetto Championship.

Schedule
The following table lists official events during the 2020–21 season.

Unofficial events
The following events were sanctioned by the PGA Tour, but did not carry FedEx Cup points or official money, nor were wins official.

Location of tournaments

FedEx Cup

Points distribution

The distribution of points for 2020–21 PGA Tour events is as follows:

Tour Championship starting score (to par), based on position in the FedEx Cup rankings after the BMW Championship:

FedEx Cup Standings
For full rankings, see 2021 FedEx Cup Playoffs.

Final FedEx Cup standings of the 30 qualifiers for the Tour Championship:

• Did not play

Awards

Player Impact Program (PIP)
Tiger Woods finished ahead of Phil Mickelson to win the PIP rankings for 2021. The rankings were based upon Google searches; social media reach; TV broadcast appearances; global media mentions and familiarity of a player's "brand". As winner he received $8m. Second place received $6m, 3rd to 6th received $3.5m, and 7th to 10th received $3m.

See also
2020 in golf
2021 in golf
2020 European Tour
2021 European Tour
2020–21 Korn Ferry Tour
2020–21 PGA Tour Champions season

Notes

References

External links
Official site
Media Guide

2021
2020 in golf
2021 in golf